Sachs is a German surname, meaning "man from Saxony". Sachs is a common surname among Ashkenazi Jews from Saxony, in the United States sometimes adopted in the variant Zaks, supposedly in reference to the Hebrew phrase Zera Kodesh Shemo (ZaKS), literally   "his name is Holy Seed," a quotation from Isaiah 6:13.

Notable people with the surname Sachs include:

Albie Sachs (born 1935), South African Constitutional Court Justice
Andrew Sachs (1930–2016), German-British actor
Bernard Sachs (1858–1944), American neurologist
Curt Sachs (also Kurth Sachs, 1881–1959), German music historian
Ed Sachs (1918–1996), American professional basketball player
Eddie Sachs (1927–1964), American racecar driver
Edwin Sachs (1870–1919), British architect
Ernest Sachs (1879–1958), American neurosurgeon
Ernest Sachs, Jr. (1916–2001), American neurosurgeon 
Gunter Sachs (1932–2011), German photographer, researcher (mathematics and astrology), and playboy
George Sachs (1896–1961), Russia-born German and US metallurgist
Hans Sachs (disambiguation)
Hans Sachs (1494–1576), German poet
Hans Sachs (serologist) (1877–1945), German serologist
Harvey Sachs (born 1946), American-Canadian conductor and writer
Heinrich Sachs (1863–1928), German neuroanatomist
Hilda Sachs (1857–1935), Swedish journalist and women's rights activist 
Horst Sachs, German mathematician, expert in graph theory
Hugh Sachs, British actor in the TV series Benidorm
Ignacy Sachs (born 1927), Polish, naturalized French economist and ecosocioeconomist
James D. Sachs, retired U.S. Air Force veteran, game artist, and game programmer
Jeffrey Sachs (born 1954), American economist
Johann Sachs (born 1843), German composer
Jonathan Sachs (born 1947), American computer programmer
Julius von Sachs (1832–1897), German botanist
Lenny Sachs (1897–1942), American football player and basketball coach
Lessie Sachs (1897–1942), German-born poet and artist
Leonard Sachs (1909–1990), British actor
Prof Marcus Sachs (1812-1869) Professor of Hebrew in Aberdeen
Margaret Michaelis-Sachs (1902–1985), art photographer
Margaret Sachs, an American lawyer and the Robert Cotten Alston Professor at University of Georgia
Maria Sachs, American politician
Mary Sachs (1882–1973), American playwright and poet.
Maurice Sachs (1906–1945), French author
Mavro Sachs (1817–1888), Croatian physician
Mendel Sachs (born 1927), American physicist
Michael Sachs (born 1808), German rabbi
Milan Sachs (1884–1968), Czech-Croatian opera conductor and composer
Moses Sachs (1800–1870), German Meshulach
Nelly Sachs (1891–1970), German poet
Paul J. Sachs (1878–1965), American museum director
Philip Sachs (1902–1973), American professional basketball coach
Rainer K. Sachs (born 1932), German-born American scientist known for his work in astrophysics and biophysics
Robin Sachs (1951–2013), British actor
Salomo Sachs (1772–1855), Prussian architect and engineer
Stephen Sachs (born 1959), American stage director and playwright
Stephen H. Sachs (1934–2022), American politician and Attorney General of Maryland
Wolfgang Sachs (born 1946), German researcher and author of books

Fictional characters:
Andrea Sachs, created by Lauren Weisberger
Daniel Sachs, from an online graphic novel Demonology 101
Amelia Sachs, an NYPD police officer in the Lincoln Rhyme series of crime/mystery novels by Jeffery Deaver.
Benjamin Sachs, protagonist in the novel Leviathan (Auster novel) by Paul Auster

See also

Goldman Sachs, a bank
Gordon Zacks
Sachs Electric, a Missouri electrical contractor
Sachs Motorcycles
Sachs Patera
Sachse (disambiguation)
Sacks (surname)
Saks (disambiguation)
Sax (disambiguation)
Saxe (disambiguation)
Small-angle X-ray scattering (SAXS)
Zaks (disambiguation)
Zaks, a building toy
Zax (disambiguation)
ZF Sachs AG, a company

References

German-language surnames
German toponymic surnames
Jewish surnames
Yiddish-language surnames
Kohenitic surnames
Ethnonymic surnames